The Perfect Woman is a 1949 British farce comedy film directed by Bernard Knowles and written by George Black, Jr and J. B. Boothroyd, based upon a play by Wallace Geoffrey and Basil Mitchell. The screenplay concerns a scientist who creates a robotic woman in his lab.

Plot

Ramshead, a butler, tells his lazy and currently broke master, Roger Cavendish, that he is broke. They search the newspaper for potential work.

Professor Ernest Belman has placed an advert in the Times seeking help. They phone and arrange to meet.

The professor has created a woman robot in his lab based on his niece, Penelope.

Cavendish appears for interview (with his butler). They are tasked with looking after his robot, Olga, for a week but are told they must never say the word "love" in front of it.

When Penelope's date cancels, the housekeeper Buttercup suggests she pretends to be the robot. Cavendish and Ramshead take her to a hotel and stay in the bridal suite, sparking many rumours amongst the staff. Cavendish's rich aunt arrives and thinks he has married. The robot is sent to help to explain things.

Cast
 Patricia Roc as Penelope Belman
 Stanley Holloway as Ramshead
 Nigel Patrick as Roger Cavendish
 Miles Malleson as Professor Ernest Belman
 Irene Handl as Mrs. Butters (Buttercup) the professor's housekeeper
 Anita Sharp-Bolster as Lady Diana
 Fred Berger as Farini
 David Hurst as Wolfgang Winkel the hotel waiter
 Pamela Devis as Olga the Robot
 Jerry Verno as Football Fan On Underground
 Johnnie Schofield as Ticket Collector
 Philippa Gill as Lady Mary
 Jerry Desmonde as Dress shop manager
 Dora Bryan as Model in shop
 Noel Howlett as Scientist

Original play
The original play debuted on 11 September 1948 and ran for 224 performances.

Production
Producers George and Alfred Black were sons of a famous producer.

Roc made the film after spending several months in Paris, where she made Retour and The Man on the Eiffel Tower. Roc was under contract to J. Arthur Rank at the time. Filming took place in January 1949. The film was shot in 38 days at only three-quarters of its budgeted cost. It was made at Denham Studios with sets designed by James Elder Wills.

Pamela Devis was cast as the robot because of her resemblance to Roc.

Reception
Roc left the Rank organisation before the film was released. The film was released on a double bill, and given a West End screening. However it proved popular and made a profit.

Two Cities' executive producer Earl St John hoped to reunite Holloway, Patrick and Roc for a sequel, The Perfect Man. However no film resulted.

Television version 
The BBC broadcast a live adaptation of the Geoffrey and Mitchell play in  the Sunday Night Theatre slot on 6 May 1956.

References

External links

Review of film at New York Times
The Perfect Woman at BFI
The Perfect Woman at TCMDB

1949 films
1940s science fiction comedy films
British science fiction comedy films
Films directed by Bernard Knowles
Android (robot) films
British black-and-white films
Films set in London
Films shot at Denham Film Studios
1950s English-language films
1940s British films
1950s British films